The flag of Nottinghamshire was registered with the Flag Institute in 2011. The flag includes a white-fimbriated red St George's Cross on a green background, and a green silhouette of James Woodford's bronze statue of Robin Hood on a white shield located close to Nottingham Castle. 



Flag design
Andy Whittaker of BBC Radio Nottingham organised a competition following a suggestion by two of his listeners, Jane Bealby and Mike Gaunt. The final design was made up of elements from the designs submitted by a number of people to the radio station for consideration as the new county flag.

The Pantone colours for the flag are:

Flag of Nottinghamshire County Council 
The Banner of Arms of the Nottinghamshire County Council has a large stylized gold oak tree representing Sherwood Forest defacing a wavy blue and white horizontal wave pattern representing the Trent River that runs across the country.

References

Nottinghamshire
Nottinghamshire
Nottinghamshire
Robin Hood
Nottinghamshire
Nottinghamshire